The Oxford Chemistry Primers are a series of short texts providing accounts of a range of essential topics in chemistry and chemical engineering written for undergraduate study. The first primer Organic Synthesis: The Roles of Boron and Silicon was published by Oxford University Press in 1991. As of 2017 there are 100 titles in the series, written by a wide range of authors. The editors are Steve G. Davies (Organic Chemistry), Richard G. Compton (Physical Chemistry), John Evans (Inorganic Chemistry) and Lynn Gladden (Chemical Engineering).

Titles

References

Chemistry books
Chemistry education
Chemistry Primers, Oxford